Alene Robertson is an American musical theatre actress based in Naperville, Illinois, United States. She has been awarded nine Joseph Jefferson Awards (equivalent to the Antoinette Perry "Tony" Awards from the Chicago region).  Robertson is best known for acting in the National Tour production of the musical Annie as Miss Hannigan.

References

American musical theatre actresses
Year of birth missing (living people)
Living people
21st-century American women